The Barheș (also: Barcheș) is a right tributary of the river Caraș (Karaš) in Romania. It flows into the Caraș in Grădinari.

References

Rivers of Romania
Rivers of Caraș-Severin County